

Dinosaurs

Newly named dinosaurs

Pterosaurs

New taxa

Synapsids

Non-mammalian

References

1850s in paleontology
Paleontology